A.C. Juvenes/Dogana is a Sammarinese football club based in Dogana, in the civil parish of Serravalle. The club was founded in 2000 after the merger of S.S. Juvenes (named after a historical side in San Marino) and G.S. Dogana. Until season 2006/07 Juvenes/Dogana was the only team to play in both Sammarinese and Italian leagues, taking part in the Girone A of Campionato Sammarinese and in the Italian amateur levels, but it has since retired from the Italian leagues. The team's colors are light blue, red and white.

Honours 
Coppa Titano: 9
S.S. Juvenes: 1965, 1968, 1976, 1978, 1984
G.S. Dogana: 1977, 1979
A.C. Juvenes/Dogana: 2008–2009, 2010–2011

European record 

Notes
 1Q: First qualifying round
 2Q: Second qualifying round

Current squad

References

External links 
Official homepage
FSGC page
eufo.de – Team Squad

 
Football clubs in San Marino
Association football clubs established in 2000
Former Italian football clubs
2000 establishments in San Marino